Tudorella is a genus of land snails, terrestrial gastropod mollusks in the family Pomatiidae.

Distribution 
This genus of land snails inhabits the coasts of the western Mediterranean Sea.

Species 
Species in the genus Tudorella include:
 † Tudorella baudoni (Michaud, 1862) 
 † Tudorella draparnaudii (Matheron, 1843) 
Tudorella ferruginea (Lamarck, 1822)
 † Tudorella lartetii (Noulet, 1854) 
 Tudorella mauretanica (Pallary, 1898)
Tudorella melitense (G.B. Sowerby I, 1847) 
 Tudorella multisulcata (Potiez & Michaud, 1838)
 Tudorella panormitana (Sacchi, 1954)
 Tudorella rubicunda (Pallary, 1936)
 † Tudorella schafarziki (Gaál, 1910) †
 † Tudorella sepulta (Rambur, 1862) 
Tudorella sulcata (Draparnaud, 1805)
Species brought into synonymy
† Tudorella conica (Klein, 1853): synonym of † Pomatias conicus (Klein, 1853)
 † Tudorella draparnaudi [sic]: synonym of † Tudorella draparnaudii (Matheron, 1843) (incorrect subsequent spelling)
 † Tudorella larteti [sic]: synonym of Tudorella lartetii † (Noulet, 1854)

References 

 Welter-Schultes, F.W. (2012). European non-marine molluscs, a guide for species identification. Planet Poster Editions, Göttingen.

External links
 Fischer, P. (1880-1887). Manuel de conchyliologie et de paléontologie conchyliologique, ou histoire naturelle des mollusques vivants et fossiles suivi d'un Appendice sur les Brachiopodes par D. P. Oehlert. Avec 23 planches contenant 600 figures dessinées par S. P. Woodward.. Paris: F. Savy. Published in 11 parts (fascicules), xxiv + 1369 pp., 23 pls.

Pomatiidae
Gastropod genera